Alexander Shinin (born January 7, 1984) is a Russian professional ice hockey defenceman who currently plays for Traktor Chelyabinsk in the Kontinental Hockey League (KHL). He has previously only played with HC Severstal of the KHL.

References

External links

1984 births
Living people
Severstal Cherepovets players
Traktor Chelyabinsk players
Russian ice hockey defencemen